Chung Kyung-ho (born 22 May 1980) is a former South Korean footballer. He was part of South Korean national team in the 2004 Summer Olympics and the 2004 AFC Asian Cup. He was also selected for South Korea's squad for the 2006 FIFA World Cup by performing a key role in qualifiers, but didn't appear in World Cup matches.

Career statistics

Club

International
Results list South Korea's goal tally first.

Honours 
University of Ulsan
Korean President's Cup runner-up: 2001

Ulsan Hyundai Horang-i
Korean League Cup: 2007

References

External links
 
 Chung Kyung-ho at KFA 
 
 

1980 births
Living people
Association football forwards
South Korean footballers
South Korea international footballers
Ulsan Hyundai FC players
Gimcheon Sangmu FC players
Jeonbuk Hyundai Motors players
Gangwon FC players
Daejeon Hana Citizen FC players
K League 1 players
Seongnam FC managers
2004 AFC Asian Cup players
2006 FIFA World Cup players
Footballers at the 2004 Summer Olympics
Olympic footballers of South Korea
University of Ulsan alumni
People from Samcheok
Sportspeople from Gangwon Province, South Korea